Shaka Polytechnic in Benin City, Nigeria, is a privately owned tertiary institution which was established on 6 February 1986 as the Nigerian Institute of Computer Science.

Background 
The school was founded by Late Donaldson Shaka Momodu. It has its main campus at Evbo-Ewedo, Egba Way, along Benin-Auchi Road and the first campus at 1, Prince Shaka Momodu Street, Ogiso Quarters, Benin City.  The institution became accredited as a Polytechnic by the National Board for Technical Education (NBTE) in 2013. The polytechnic is under the leadership of Henrietta Shaka Momodu.

Academic Programmes 
The institution runs four schools/faculties with a total of nine academic programmes for the award of National Diploma(ND) and Higher National Diploma(HND);

School of Business and Management

 Accountancy
 Business Administration and Management
 Marketing
 Mass Communication

School of Applied Science
 Computer Science
 Statistics

School of Engineering
 Electrical/Electronics Engineering
 Computer Engineering

School of Environmental Science 
 Estate Management

See also 
List of Polytechnics in Nigeria

References

External links
 Official website

Polytechnics in Nigeria
Education in Benin City
Educational institutions established in 1986
1986 establishments in Nigeria